Skyrider or SkyRider may refer to:
Bud Berning, aka Skyrider, a Denver-based musician and member of Sole and the Skyrider Band
Skyrider Flugschule, a German aircraft manufacturer and flight training school
Skyrider (Kamen Rider), the main character of The New Kamen Rider
HTM Skyrider, a helicopter
Skyrider (roller coaster), a former roller coaster at Canada's Wonderland, now known as Freestyle at Cavallino Matto
SkyRider (seat), a plane seat manufactured by Aviointeriors
SKT Skyrider 06, a Swiss helicopter design
A ride at Skyline Park
A ride at Wild Wild Wet

See also
Skyriders, video game